María Luisa Fernández (born 7 March 1943) is a Spanish gymnast. She competed in six events at the 1960 Summer Olympics.

References

1943 births
Living people
Spanish female artistic gymnasts
Olympic gymnasts of Spain
Gymnasts at the 1960 Summer Olympics
Sportspeople from Oviedo